Streptomyces polygonati is a bacterium species from the genus of Streptomyces which has been isolated from the root of the plant Polygonatum odoratum in Harbin in China.

See also 
 List of Streptomyces species

References

External links 

Type strain of Streptomyces polygonati at BacDive -  the Bacterial Diversity Metadatabase

polygonati
Bacteria described in 2016